The Maine Media Workshops (formerly the Maine Photographic Workshops) in Rockport, Maine is an international non-profit educational organization offering year-round workshops for photographers, filmmakers, and media artists.

Students from across the country and around the world travel to the harbor village of Rockport to attend courses at all levels, from absolute beginner and serious amateur to working professional. The Young Artists Program offers creative course opportunities for high school students. Professional certificate and MFA programs in photography, film, and multimedia are available through Maine Media College.

The school's curriculum honors historical forms and practices of image making while embracing new technologies and modes of creative expression.

The Workshops
The Maine Media Workshops offer over 400 workshops and master classes in the fields of photography, filmmaking, and multimedia.  Each year it attracts over 2,000 students, from professionals to beginners. Workshops range in length from a single weekend to a seven-week work-study program and a 12-week summer residency.

Alumni of the filmmaking workshops include Alejandro González Iñárritu, Laura Poitras, Rodrigo Prieto, Michelle MacLaren, and John Leguizamo.

Maine Media College

The Maine Media Workshops are organized through Maine Media College, which offers both a 30-week Professional Certificate program and a low-residency Master of Fine Arts program. Areas of study include photography, filmmaking, and multimedia.

Transition
On August 24, 2007, The Workshops announced its approval by the Internal Revenue Service as a non-profit organization. The transition entailed the merging of the Maine Photographic Workshops and the International Film and Video Workshops together into The Maine Media Workshops. Rockport College became Maine Media College.

Faculty includes

See also
 Maine Media College
 Missouri Photo Workshop

References

External links

Educational institutions established in 1974
American photography organizations
Education in Knox County, Maine
Rockport, Maine